Perekrestok or Perekryostok, Russian for crossroads, may refer to:

 Perekrestok (supermarket chain), a Russian supermarket chain
 Perekrestok, a Soviet rock band associated with Alexander Kostarev